The 2016–17 Euroleague Basketball Next Generation Tournament, also called Adidas Next Generation Tournament by sponsorship reasons, is the 15th edition of the international junior basketball tournament organized by the Euroleague Basketball Company.

As in past years, 32 teams joined the first stage, which are played in four qualifying tournaments between January and February 2017.

Qualifying tournaments

Torneig de Bàsquet Junior Ciutat de L'Hospitalet
The Torneig de Bàsquet Junior Ciutat de L'Hospitalet was played between 6 and 8 January 2017.

Group A

Group B

Semifinals

Classification games

Final

Kaunas Tournament
The Kaunas Tournament was played between 12 and 14 January 2017.

Group A

Group B

Classification games

Final

Coín Tournament
The Coín Tournament was played between 10 and 12 February 2017.

Group A

Group B

Classification games

Final

Belgrade Tournament
The Belgrade Tournament was played between 24 and 26 February 2017.

Group A

Group B

Classification games

Final

Final Tournament
The Final Tournament will be played between 18 and 21 May 2017 in Istanbul, Turkey.

Teams

Group A

Group B

Final

Awards
MVP
 Ivan Février (Centre Fédéral)

Rising star
 Luka Šamanić (FC Barcelona Lassa)

All-tournament team
 Ivan Février (Centre Fédéral)
 Yanik Blanc (Centre Fédéral)
 Dino Radončić (Real Madrid)
 Sergi Martínez (FC Barcelona Lassa)
 Goga Bitadze (Mega Bemax)

References

External links
Next Generation tournament website

Euroleague Basketball Next Generation Tournament
Next Generation Tournament